Wayne Wilkins is a British record producer, songwriter, record engineer and record mixer. He has produced and written for artists such as Rick Astley ("Cry for Help"), Natasha Bedingfield ("These Words", "Single" and "Love Like This"), Beyoncé ("Sweet Dreams"), Cheryl Cole ("Fight For This Love", and "Promise This"), and Jordin Sparks ("Battlefield").

Early life 
Wilkins was born in Croydon, London. He began taking piano lessons by the age of four. Wilkins earned a scholarship to a music conservatory as a child. Growing up, he played organ at cathedrals and other venues around London.

Wilkins went on to Royal College of Music in London. Wilkins later graduated with a physics degree from Imperial College.

While in college one of Wilkins early jobs was teaching piano. He also interned at Townhouse Studios and Olympic Studios where he received further training in engineering, mixing, and producing.

Career 
While Wilkins was interning at Olympic Studios he got the opportunity to work for famous engineer Spike Stent. Stent's resume includes working with such artists as Madonna, Beyoncé, Björk, Lily Allen, Depeche Mode, Massive Attack, Yeah Yeah Yeahs, Oasis, U2, Usher, and Lady Gaga. Working for Stent provided Wilkins the opportunity to program for the engineer and work on high budgeted recordings. During his tenure with Stent Wilkins was able to work with producers and artists such as Timbaland, Oasis, Rodney Jerkins, Madonna and U2. Wilkins was able to work on the No Doubt Rock Steady album, which Wilkins says later on afforded him higher profile opportunities for him to work on in the industry.

In 2000, Wilkins started working independently. The first band Wilkins produced after going independent was The Corrs.

In May 2004, Natasha Bedingfield released "Single", a song co-written and co-produced by Wilkins. The song went on to reach No. 3 on the UK Singles Chart. Natasha Bedingfield followed "Single" with "These Words" released in August 2004. Co-produced and co-written by Wilkins, the song climbed to No. 1 on the UK Singles Chart and reached No. 17 on Billboards Hot 100.

Wilkins co-wrote and co-produced another hit for Natasha Bedingfield, "Love Like This", which also featured Sean Kingston. The song released in September 2007 went platinum, to the top of Billboards Dance/Club Play Songs, and to No. 11 on the Billboard Hot 100.

Keri Hilson released her debut single "Energy" off her gold album In a Perfect World... in May 2008. Wilkins co-wrote and co-produced the single with fellow prominent members of production team The Runaways, Sam Watters, Rico Love, and Louis Biancaniello.

In early 2008, Wilkins co-wrote "We Break the Dawn" alongside Solange Knowles and Andrew Frampton for Michelle Williams' third album Unexpected. He was also involved in creating the remix for the same song.

In June 2008, Shontelle's "T-Shirt" was released.  It was co-written by Wilkins. The single was a dance hit in the United Kingdom and the United States.  Reaching No. 1 on UK's Urban Chart and No. 1 on Billboards Hot Dance Club songs.

Beyoncé released her Grammy Award winning album, I Am... Sasha Fierce, in November 2008 which included the Wilkins' production and co-written single "Sweet Dreams". The song went on to reach platinum status and landed at No. 10 on the Billboard Hot 100 chart.

In May 2009, former American Idol winner Jordin Sparks released the single "Battlefield". Wilkins co-wrote and co-produced the song that reached the top 10 of Billboard'''s Hot 100. With this song Wilkins assisted the singer in achieving her third top 10 Billboard Hot 100 single.

In 2009, he worked with Irish pop band Westlife for a track "Sound of a Broken Heart" included in their Where We Are album where it charted at No. 2 in both UK Albums Chart and Irish Albums Chart.

Cheryl Cole released the single "Fight For This Love" in October 2009, taken from her album 3 Words''. Wilkins co-wrote and co-produced the single which went platinum in the UK and reached No. 1 on the UK Singles Chart.

In July 2014, Cheryl Cole released the single "Crazy Stupid Love" from her fourth studio album.  The song topped the UK Singles Chart.  Wilkins co-wrote and co-produced the song, which also features British rapper Tinie Tempah.

Further information

Musical influences 
Wilkins has cited artists such as Michael Jackson, David Foster, Whitney Houston, Chicago, John Williams, and Oscar Peterson as having a major influence on his style and tastes.

Songwriting 
With his writing techniques, Wilkins prefers to start with chord progressions as opposed to lyrics. He has said he attempts to be a "vessel" in which music just flows out of him naturally. He prefers writing and producing together to see the song all the way through both processes to make sure it's a hit. When writing Wilkins chooses not to use many sounds but only what is completely necessary. He says he tends to write simple lyrics that people can grasp with a running theme throughout the song. He likes to write simple chords to pop songs and focuses on the melody. When he can Wilkins prefers co-writing. Generally Wilkins focuses on the music and the melody and collaborates with lyricists.

Mixing and engineering 
Early in his career, Wilkins worked under mixing engineer Mark "Spike" Stent of EMI. Wilkins knows how to record and also professionally mix recordings. Wilkins prefers to record an artist where they are most comfortable, so he travels to where the artist is with portable gear.

Gear 
Wilkins' gear generally consists of an Apple Logic, a MacBook Pro and an Apogee Symphony Mobile System. Wilkins has stated his gear allows him to record anywhere in the world.

Singles

Awards and nominations 
2005 BMI London Award for "These Words"
2006 BMI London Award for "Single"
2007 BMI London Award for "Love Like This"
2008 BMI Pop Award for "Love Like This"
2008 BMI London Award for "T-Shirt"
2009 Grammy nomination Album of the Year – Beyoncé – I Am… Sasha Fierce
2009 BMI Pop Award for "Battlefield"
2010 BMI London Award for "Battlefield"
2010 BMI London Award for "Sweet Dreams"

References 

Living people
Year of birth missing (living people)
English record producers
English songwriters
English people of Indian descent
Mixing engineers